John Seitz may refer to:
 John F. Seitz (1892–1979), American cinematographer and inventor
 John A. Seitz (1908–1987), United States Army general
 John F. R. Seitz (1908–1978), United States Army general